The Somerdale School District is a community public school district that serves students in pre-kindergarten through eighth grade from Somerdale, in Camden County, New Jersey, United States.

As of the 2020–21 school year, the district, comprised of one school, had an enrollment of 461 students and 44.0 classroom teachers (on an FTE basis), for a student–teacher ratio of 10.5:1.

The district is classified by the New Jersey Department of Education as being in District Factor Group "CD", the sixth-highest of eight groupings. District Factor Groups organize districts statewide to allow comparison by common socioeconomic characteristics of the local districts. From lowest socioeconomic status to highest, the categories are A, B, CD, DE, FG, GH, I and J.

For ninth grade through twelfth grade, public school students attend Sterling High School, a regional high school district that also serves students from Magnolia and Stratford, along with the sending districts of Hi-Nella and Laurel Springs, who attend as part of sending/receiving relationships. The high school is located in Somerdale. As of the 2020–21 school year, the high school had an enrollment of 912 students and 69.0 classroom teachers (on an FTE basis), for a student–teacher ratio of 13.2:1.

School
Somerdale Park School served an enrollment of 459 students (based on 2020–21 enrollment data from the National Center for Education Statistics).
Rob Ford, Principal

Administration
Core members of the district's administration are:
Mark Pease, Superintendent
William Thompson, Business Administrator / Board Secretary

Board of education
The district's board of education is comprised of nine members who set policy and oversee the fiscal and educational operation of the district through its administration. As a Type II school district, the board's trustees are elected directly by voters to serve three-year terms of office on a staggered basis, with three seats up for election each year held (since 2012) as part of the November general election. The board appoints a superintendent to oversee the district's day-to-day operations and a business administrator to supervise the business functions of the district.

References

External links
Somerdale Park School

School Data for the Somerdale School District, National Center for Education Statistics
Sterling High School

Somerdale, New Jersey
New Jersey District Factor Group CD
School districts in Camden County, New Jersey